Lê Minh Đảo (5 March 1933 – 19 March 2020) was a South Vietnamese major general who led the 18th Division of the Army of the Republic of Vietnam (ARVN), nicknamed "The Super Men", at Xuân Lộc, the last major battle of the Vietnam War. Brigadier General Đảo became the ground commander during the last Battle for Saigon.

Early life 
Lê Minh Đảo was born in the commune of Bình Hòa in Gia Định Province. He studied at Petrus Ký High School, in Saigon, completing his high school certificate in February 1952. In 1953, he joined up to the tenth intake of the Trần Bình Trọng course at the Vietnamese National Military Academy in Đà Lạt. In June 1954, he graduated and was commissioned as a 1st lieutenant, and served for a period immediately as an instructor at the military academy. Besides, he was a vocalist and musician of the Radio France-Asie.

He was a recipient of the Commander class of the National Order of Vietnam.

Career
By April 1975, North Vietnamese forces were in full advance and most ARVN resistance had collapsed. Đảo's 18th Division, however, made a significant defence at the Battle of Xuân Lộc, 38 miles from Saigon. The fierce fighting raged for two weeks. The 18th Division, facing People's Army of Vietnam (PAVN) forces, managed to hold on for three weeks, but was overwhelmed by 21 April 1975. Saigon fell nine days later.

Đảo was famous for his emotional battlefield interview that was broadcast around the world during the fighting in which he stated that, "The communists could throw their entire Army at Xuân Lộc, the 18th will stand fast" and "I will keep Long Khánh, I will knock them down here even if they bring two divisions or three divisions!”. When pressed during the battle by Peter Arnett of the Associated Press about the hopeless situation, Đảo stated "Please tell the Americans you have seen how the 18th Division can fight and die. Now, please go!" According to Dirck Halstead, by the afternoon of 21 April, Đảo knew the battle was lost and fully expected to die before it was over.

Aside from Brigadier General Trần Quang Khôi, who commanded the III Corps Armored Task Force, Đảo was the only ARVN commander who stood and fought to save Saigon, before the city finally fell on 30 April 1975.

Lê Minh Đảo withdrew from Xuân Lộc by the order of Major General Nguyen Van Toan and wanted to continue fighting further south at Mekong Delta, where many South Vietnamese forces were still intact, but President Dương Văn Minh surrendered. Đảo was captured and sent by the new communist regime to spend 17 years in "re-education camps". He was first sent to a camp in northern Vietnam, where he spent 12 years, before being transferred into the south for another five years. After his release in May 1992, Đảo received political asylum in the United States and settled there in April 1993, where he worked as restaurant manager before retiring.

One of his hobbies was composing songs. Along with Colonel Đỗ Trọng Huề, he composed the song Nhớ Mẹ (Remembering Mother), which was well known among imprisoned ARVN personnel in re-education camps.

He died in Connecticut in March 2020.

References

External links
Conversation with Brigadier General Le Minh Dao
Welcome Back to the Paris of the Orient
The End of the Tunnel (1973–1975), PBS
Pham Ngoc Dinh, "S. Viet Generals 'Reeducated' by New Red Regime", Los Angeles Times, 3 May 1976

1933 births
2020 deaths
People from Ho Chi Minh City
Army of the Republic of Vietnam generals
Vietnamese musicians
Vietnamese exiles
Vietnamese emigrants to the United States
Vietnamese anti-communists
Vietnam War prisoners of war
People educated at Le Hong Phong High School